Hiroshi Hashimoto may refer to:

, Japanese fencer
, Japanese water polo player